2-amino-5-formylamino-6-ribosylaminopyrimidin-4(3H)-one 5'-monophosphate deformylase (ArfB) is an enzyme with systematic name 2-amino-5-formylamino-6-(5-phospho-D-ribosylamino)pyrimidin-4(3H)-one amidohydrolase. This enzyme catalyses the following chemical reaction

 2-Amino-5-formylamino-6-(5-phospho-D-ribosylamino)pyrimidin-4(3H)-one + H2O  2,5-diamino-6-(5-phospho-D-ribosylamino)pyrimidin-4(3H)-one + formate

The enzyme catalyses the second step in archaeal riboflavin and 7,8-didemethyl-8-hydroxy-5-deazariboflavin biosynthesis.

References

External links 
 

EC 3.5.1